Heer and Hero is a 2013 Indian Punjabi film directed by Sagar S Sharma. Heer and Hero is produced by Harjeet Bhullar and Etch-B, and stars Manissha Lamba, Arya Babbar, Gurpreet Ghuggi, Preet Bhullar, Mukul Dev and Manoj Pahwa. The film also has a song titled 'Haule Haule', with Music Director Mukhtar Sahota, vocals of Ranjit Rana and lyrics by Yaadwinder Pamma.

Plot
Heer and Hero is the story of three lovers with a girl. The girl is very career-oriented and tells these men that if one of them helps her to go to a foreign country for her dream project, she will choose him as her partner. The story goes on with the journey to reach the destination with these men.

Cast
Arya Babbar as Fateh
Manissha Lamba as Geet
Preet Bhullar as Raj
Gurpreet Ghuggi as Bhupinder 'Bhuppi' Singh   
Mukul Dev as Police Inspector
Manoj Pahwa as Kochi Badmash
Yograj Singh
Hazel Keech as an item number "Lak Tunu Tunu"
Milkha Singh

Soundtrack

The soundtrack of Heer and Hero consists of 9 songs composed by Gurmeet Singh & Mukhtar Sahota, the lyrics of which were written by Kumaar, Veet Baljit, Yadwinder Pamma, Jaggi Singh, Kala Nizampuri and Kunwar Juneja.

References

External links 
"Heer and Hero Official Facebook Page"

2013 films
Indian romantic comedy films
2013 romantic comedy films
Films scored by Mukhtar Sahota
Punjabi-language Indian films
2010s Punjabi-language films